Club Patí Manlleu is a Catalan rink hockey club from Manlleu, Osona established in 1973, currently competing in the OK Liga Plata and the OK Liga Femenina.

History
Founded in 1973, the first success of CP Manlleu was the first promotion ever of the women's team to the first division in 2012. Two years later, the men's team repeated the success by promoting to the OK Liga.

In 2015, the women's team conquered the first club's title by winning the Copa de la Reina played in Lloret de Mar and in 2016, they lost the final of the 2015–16 CERH Women's European Cup in the penalty shootout against their neighbours Voltregà.

Season to season

Women's team

Men's team

Trophies

Women's
OK Liga Femenina: 1
2019–20
Spanish Cup (Copa de la Reina): 1
2015

References

External links
Official website

Sports clubs established in 1973
Catalan rink hockey clubs
Sports clubs in Barcelona